Nar Abu Samand Begu Khel is a town and union council in Lakki Marwat District of Khyber-Pakhtunkhwa. It is located at 32°48'45N 70°47'21E and has an altitude of 261 metres (859 feet).

References

Populated places in Lakki Marwat District
Union councils of Lakki Marwat District